"Better Than" is a song by Australian band John Butler Trio from their fourth studio album, Grand National. Produced by John Butler and Mario Caldato Jr., it was released in the United States on 20 February 2007 as an online single, the third single in Australia and the first overseas single from the album.

The EP includes two previously unreleased tracks recorded in the Grand National sessions, and a special radio mix version of "Better Than" from US sound man, Chris Lord-Alge. To this day, the radio mix version still receives moderate airplay from adult alternative stations.

The EP debuted at number sixteen in the ARIA Singles Chart on 3 September 2007. "Better Than" was also popular in the Triple J Hottest 100, 2007 being voted at number four and appearing on the compilation CD.

On 31 July 2007 the song was performed on The Tonight Show with Jay Leno.

Music video 
An accompanying music video for "Better Than", which utilizes the "Chris Lord-Alge radio mix" has been released on YouTube on 1 August 2007. In this video, members of the John Butler Trio band perform the song while on animated posters and performing on various spots of the streets with various pedestrians and skateboarders going by. Throughout, 2 messages (which reiterate the lyrical content in the song itself) are shown in a style of graffiti saying "The best things in life...aren't things!" and "Art changes people... people change the world."

Track listing 

All tracks written by John Butler

Personnel 
The John Butler Trio
John Butler – vocals, acoustic/amplified 6 string guitar, banjo, harmonica
Shannon Birchall – double bass, backing vocals
Michael Barker – drums, congas, shaker, tambourine, cow bells, vibraslap, backing vocals

Production credits
John Butler – producer
Mario Caldato Jr. – producer, engineer, mixing
Shannon Birchall – co-producer
Michael Barker – co-producer
Jarrad Hearman – assistant engineer
Bernie Grundman – mastering
Tom Walker – artwork

Charts

Weekly charts

Year-end charts

References

2007 singles
2007 songs
Atlantic Records singles
John Butler Trio songs
Song recordings produced by Mario Caldato Jr.
Songs written by John Butler (musician)